The holidays of Bosnia and Herzegovina include, in various jurisdictions:

Public Holidays

See also
 Public holidays in Yugoslavia

References 

Bosnia and Herzegovina
Bosnia and Herzegovina culture
Holidays
Bosnia and Herzegovina